Transient receptor potential cation channel, subfamily C, member 6, also known as TRPC6, is a human gene encoding a protein of the same name. TRPC6 is a transient receptor potential channel of the classical TRPC subfamily. It has been associated with depression and anxiety (see below), as well as with focal segmental glomerulosclerosis (FSGS).

Interactions 

TRPC6 has been shown to interact with:
 FYN, 
 TRPC2,  and
 TRPC3.

Ligands 

Two of the primary active constituents responsible for the antidepressant and anxiolytic benefits of Hypericum perforatum, also known as St. John's Wort, are hyperforin and adhyperforin. These compounds are inhibitors of the reuptake of serotonin, norepinephrine, dopamine, γ-aminobutyric acid, and glutamate, and they are reported to exert these effects by binding to and activating TRPC6. Recent results with hyperforin have cast doubt on these findings as similar currents are seen upon Hyperforin treatment regardless of the presence of TRPC6.

References

Further reading

External links 
 

Membrane proteins
Ion channels